The Sarvottam Yudh Seva Medal (Ultimate War Service Medal) is India's highest wartime distinguished service decoration. It is awarded for the highest degree of distinguished service in an operational context, which includes times of war, conflict, or hostilities. The award is a war-time equivalent of the Param Vishisht Seva Medal, which is India's highest peacetime distinguished service decoration. 

The medal has been awarded only three times in history. They have been awarded to officers commanding a large force in a conflict. Lieutenant General A.S. Kalkat was the overall commander of the Indian Peacekeeping Force (IPKF) in Sri Lanka. Air Marshal Vinod Patney was the Western Air Commander and Lieutenant General H.M. Khanna was the Northern Army Commander during the Kargil War.

Eligibility
The Sarvottam Yudh Seva Medal may be awarded posthumously. It is awarded for distinguished service of the most exceptional order during war/conflict/hostilities. It may be awarded to all ranks of the Army, the Navy and the Air Force including those of Territorial Army Units, Auxiliary and Reserve Forces and other lawfully constituted Armed Forces when embodied, as well as Nursing Officers and other members of the Nursing Services in the Armed Forces.

Design 
The medal is circular in shape, 35 mm in diameter and fitted to a plain horizontal bar with standard fittings. It is made of gold gilt. On its obverse is the State Emblem and the inscriptions "SARVOTTAM YUDH SEVA MEDAL" (in English). On its reverse, it has a five pointed star.
Ribbon: Golden colour with one red vertical stripe in the centre dividing it into two equal parts. The riband is of gold colour with one red stripe down the centre dividing it into two equal parts. If a recipient of the medal is subsequently awarded the medal again, every such further award shall be recognized by a bar to be attached to the riband by which the medal is suspended. For every such bar, a miniature insignia of a pattern approved by the Government shall be added to the riband when worn alone.

List of recipients 
Following is the list of awardees.

See also 
Param Vishisht Seva Medal - the peace-time equivalent

References

Civil awards and decorations of India
Military awards and decorations of India